The original St. Peter's began as an Episcopal mission established in 1853.  Bishop William H. DeLancey appointed Dr. James Rankine, who conducted services in a small wooden chapel in 1861. He served as first rector of the new St. Peter's church from 1861-1896 and also served as the president of Hobart (later Hobart and William Smith Colleges) from 1869 to 1871. Another president of Hobart, Dr. Maunsell Van Rensselaer also served as an early rector of St. Peter's Church.

The cornerstone of the current large gothic structure, designed by the noted American architect Richard Upjohn  was laid in 1868 and the church construction completed in 1870, when it was consecrated as a memorial to Bishop DeLancey, where his remains are interred.  A large bell tower was added in 1878.  Most recently, in 1986, the church underwent a complete restoration and the St. Peter's Community Arts Academy was established.

From the Parish Records—Rectors of St. Peter's Church

 The Reverend James Rankine, 1861 - 1896
 The Reverend Maunsell VanRensselaer 1870 - 1871
 The Reverend John Brewster Hubbs 1897 - 1914
 The Reverend Kenneth Bray 1914 - 1924
 The Reverend Ross R. Calvin 1925 - 1926
 The Reverend Herbert Hawkins 1926 - 1928
 The Reverend Howard Hassinger 1928 - 1944
 The Reverend Norman Remmel 1944 - 1972
 The Reverend Smith Lain 1972 - 1980
 The Reverend James H. Adams 1981–present

References

External links
 William Heathcote DeLancey
 History of the Churches in Geneva, NY
 Address upon the Reinterment of Bishop William H. DeLancey's remains in St. Peter's Church, Geneva, NY 
 The Episcopal Diocese of Rochester, New York
 St. Peter's Facebook Page
 St. Peter's Community Arts Academy

Richard Upjohn church buildings
19th-century Episcopal church buildings
Churches in Ontario County, New York
Episcopal church buildings in New York (state)
Geneva, New York
Religious organizations established in 1861
Churches completed in 1870